My Grandparents' War is a 2019 British Channel 4 television series made to commemorate the 80th anniversary of the start of World War II, which follows the wartime stories of the grandparents of famous British people. It has four episodes and was first broadcast in November 2019. A second series comprising four episodes aired during the autumn of 2022.

Series 1
Episode 1 - Helena Bonham Carter
Episode 2 - Mark Rylance
Episode 3 - Kristin Scott Thomas
Episode 4 - Carey Mulligan

Series 2
Episode 1 - Kit Harington
Episode 2 - Keira Knightley
Episode 3 - Emeli Sandé
Episode 4 - Toby Jones

References

External links

2019 British television series debuts
2010s British documentary television series
2020s British documentary television series
Channel 4 documentary series
World War II television documentaries
Documentary television series about World War II
English-language television shows